José Luis Borbolla Chavira (31 January 1920 –  11 February 2001) was a Mexican former striker who played professionally in Liga MX and La Liga and represented Mexico at the 1950 FIFA World Cup. He was also the first Mexican to suit up for Real Madrid.

Career
Born in Mexico City, Mexico, Borbolla played club football with local sides Asturias, España, and Marte, where he won the 1942–43 Mexican Primera División and Campeón de Campeones titles. In 1944, he moved to Europe to play with the Spanish clubs Deportivo La Coruña, Real Madrid (where he became the club's second Mexican player) and Celta Vigo. Borbolla played for Real Madrid in the 1944–45 Copa del Generalísimo.

He returned to Mexico to join Veracruz. He later played for América, where he retired to become a coach for one season.

Borbolla made three international appearances for Mexico during 1950, including playing in the 1950 FIFA World Cup in the match against Switzerland.

After he retired from playing and coaching, Borbolla formed a manufacturing business that sold football products in Central America.

References

External links
 

1920 births
2001 deaths
Footballers from Mexico City
Mexico international footballers
Mexican people of Asturian descent
Deportivo de La Coruña players
Real Madrid CF players
RC Celta de Vigo players
C.D. Veracruz footballers
Club América footballers
Mexican people of Spanish descent
La Liga players
1950 FIFA World Cup players
Real Club España footballers
Association football forwards
Mexican expatriate footballers
Mexican expatriate sportspeople in Spain
Expatriate footballers in Spain
Mexican footballers